Jeff Mutis (born December 20, 1966) is an American former professional baseball pitcher.

Mutis was drafted by the Cleveland Indians in the 34th round of the 1985 Major League Baseball draft, but did not sign.  He was subsequently drafted by the Indians in the 1st round (27th pick) of the 1988 Major League Baseball draft.  In 1993, he was selected off waivers by the Florida Marlins, and he played his final major league game with them on July 31, 1994.

External links

1966 births
Living people
Allentown Ambassadors players
American expatriate baseball players in Canada
Baseball players from Pennsylvania
Burlington Indians players (1986–2006)
Canton-Akron Indians players
Charlotte Knights players
Cleveland Indians players
Colorado Springs Sky Sox players
Edmonton Trappers players
Florida Marlins players
Kinston Indians players
Lafayette Leopards baseball players
Louisville Redbirds players
Major League Baseball pitchers
Sportspeople from Allentown, Pennsylvania